The Very Best of Bonnie Tyler is the name or partial name of many Bonnie Tyler albums. It may refer to:

 The Very Best of Bonnie Tyler (1981 album)
 The Very Best of Bonnie Tyler (1993 album)
 The Very Best of Bonnie Tyler (1996 album)
 The Very Best of Bonnie Tyler (2001 album)
 The Very Best of Bonnie Tyler (2003 album)
 The Very Best of Bonnie Tyler (2015 album)
 The Very Best of Bonnie Tyler Volume 2, 1994
 Power & Passion: The Very Best of Bonnie Tyler, 1996
 The Very Best of Bonnie Tyler: Holding Out for a Hero, 2011